Itelmenite is a rare sulfate mineral with the formula MnCr2S4. It was discovered in Social Circle meteorite found in Georgia, US.

Relation to other minerals
Joegoldsteinite is defined as manganese-analogue of daubréelite (iron-rich mineral). It is also analogous to kalininite (Zn-dominant) and cuprokalininite (Cu-dominant).

External links
 Joegoldsteinite on Mindat:

References

Sulfide minerals
Chromium minerals
Manganese minerals
Cubic minerals
Minerals in space group 227